FC Sluch Berezne, is a football team based in Berezne, Ukraine.

History
The club appeared sometime in the 1970s.

Honors
Ukrainian Cup for collective teams of physical culture
 Holders: (1): 1981
 Finalists: (1): 1982

Rivne Oblast football championship
 Winners (2): 1996, 1998
 Runners-up (4): 1983, 1987, 1997, 2009

References

Football clubs in Rivne Oblast
Amateur football clubs in Ukraine